Shermine Shahrivar (born 17 September 1982) is a German model and beauty pageant titleholder who won Miss Europe 2005.

Early life and education
Shahrivar was born to Iranian parents. Her family moved to Germany when she was one year old. Her mother and brothers live in Germany. She was raised speaking German and Persian language, and she is also fluent in French and English. Shahrivar has a university degree in social sciences.

Career
Shahrivar became Miss Germany in 2004 and then won the overall title of Miss Europe in 2005 while competing in France.

She was selected to be the host of the Oberhausen, Germany Nowruz celebration, said to be the largest in the world, in March 2005. She hosted Traumpartner TV in Germany from December 2004 to August 2005.

References

External links

 Shermine at Model Management
 Iran-Plus photos
 Persian Mirror article

1982 births
German beauty pageant winners
German expatriates in the United States
Iranian emigrants to Germany
Iranian female models
Lee Strasberg Theatre and Film Institute alumni
Living people
Miss Europe winners
Miss Universe 2004 contestants